Hamari Baat is a Bollywood film. It was released in 1943.

Cast
Devika Rani
Suraiya
David Abraham
Dulari

Soundtrack
The music of the film was composed by Anil Biswas.

References

External links
 

1943 films
1940s Hindi-language films
Indian black-and-white films